Thomas Hansen Kingo (15 December 1634 – 14 October 1703 Odense) was a Danish bishop, poet and hymn-writer born at Slangerup, near Copenhagen. His work marked the high point of Danish baroque poetry.

His father was a weaver of modest means; the name Kingo is a shortening of the Scottish name "Kinghorn". In his youth, Kingo wrote a series of poems picturing humorous scenes in village life and a pastoral love poem, Chrysillis. He studied theology at the University of Copenhagen, graduating in 1654, and for some time acted as private tutor. In 1661 he was appointed vicar to the pastor at Kirke Helsinge, and in 1668 he was ordained a minister at his native town, where his poetic activity began.

At first he essayed patriotic poems, but later devoted himself almost entirely to writing hymns, and in 1674 the first part of his Aandelige Siunge-Koor ("Spiritual Song Choir") appeared; followed in 1681 by a second part. This work consists of a collection of beautiful hymns several of which are still popular in the Danish Church.

In 1677 Kingo was appointed bishop of Funen. Charged by the government with the compilation of a new hymn-book, he edited what became known as Kingo's hymnal (Kingos Psalmebog, 1699), which contains eighty-five of his own compositions, and which is still used in various parts of Denmark and Norway. Some parts of the Danish rural population were firmly sticking to his hymns during the pietist and rationalist period contributing to their survival. The same goes for the Faroe Islands, where his hymns have been in widespread use through most of the 20th century, often sung to quite complicated folk melodies, which may, however, often be traced back to Kingo’s melody collection, or Gradual, from 1699, as described by Marianne Clausen in her magnum opus about Faroese folk singing.

Though not the first Danish hymn writer Kingo must be considered the first real important one and also among the Danish poets of the 17th century he is generally a leading figure. His hymns are born by a forceful and often Old Testamental wrath and renunciation of the world switching with Christian mildness and confidence. Both elements are thrown in relief by his private thrift and fighting nature. His worldly poems and patriotic songs are often long-winded and marked by outer effects but in short version he is unequalled, as in his both plain and worthy commemorative poem of the naval hero Niels Juel.

References

External links

 Kingo's Passion Hymns, with English translations

1634 births
1703 deaths
Danish Lutheran bishops
Danish male poets
University of Copenhagen alumni
17th-century Lutheran bishops
Danish Lutheran hymnwriters
Hymnal editors
17th-century Danish writers
17th-century Danish clergy
17th-century male writers